Kala Bhushana Susila Kuragama (සුසිලා කූරගම, [Sinhala]; 14 October 1943 – 1 February 2016), was an actress in Sri Lankan cinema, stage drama and television. She became very popular with the role "Ensina" she played in the television serial Kopi Kade.

Personal life
She was born on 14 October 1943 in Thimbirigasyaya, Narahenpita, Colombo. She completed education from Sri Parakramabahu College, Narahenpita.

Shee was married to M. P. Gunathilake, a retired police constable. The couple has 4 children.

She had been seriously ill for some time and had been receiving treatment at the Sri Jayewardenepura Hospital since 22 January 2016. Kuragama died on 1 February 2016 at the age of 72 while receiving treatment at Sri Jayewardenepura General Hospital. The funeral took place on 3 February 2016 at the Colombo cemetery.

Career
She started acting at the age of 7 in several Nadagam and Noorthi dramas. She made first stage drama appearance with the play Sakkara Wattan produced by GDL Perera. Then she acted in the stage dramas Natabun, Manape, Avanhala, Elara Dutugemunu, Hemamali and Saradiel.

Kuragama made her maiden cinema appearance with the 1978 film Deepanjali directed by Dharma Sri Caldera. Since then, she has acted in many comedic supportive roles in the commercial films such as Muwan Pelessa, Ajasaththa, Gimhane Gee Nade, Vijay Saja Ajay, Naralowa Holman and Juriya Mamai. She has been involved in theater, drama, theater and film production, acting and drama. She produced the stage plays Sarapinage Walawwa, Silin Bilin, Sathmuthu, Diyasena, Upadinna Sakunthala and Rodi Kella.

In 1981, Kuragama was selected to the television serial Kopi Kade by Thevis Guruge. Her role as "Ensina" became highly popularized among the public and she was usually known by his character name rather than real name. She appeared in the series from the beginning which first aired on 1 April 1987.

She sang duet songs with fellow actor Chandrasiri Kodithuwakku such as Lanka Lanka, Oba Dakkoth Hari, Lassana Sande and Esuru Kala Kalaye. She also held the one-man concert "Ensinage Sapirina".

Filmography

References

External links
 කෝපිකඩේ එන්සිනා සමුගනී
 සුසිලා කූරගම මහත්මිය අභාවප‍්‍රාප්ත වෙයි
 එන්සිනා ජීවන රඟ මඩලෙන් සමුගනී

Sri Lankan film actresses
Sinhalese actresses
1943 births
2016 deaths